"Lost Boy" is the debut single by Canadian singer Ruth B. It was released on February 12, 2015. She first released it by singing a six-second video on Vine in January 2015.

Composition and history
The piano pop ballad is written in the key of G major in cut time with a tempo of 62 beats per minute. It follows a chord progression of EmG/DCG, and Berhe's vocals span from F3 to B4.

In November 2014, she posted a Vine of her singing a line that she had made up, which was inspired by the television series Once Upon a Time. The video went viral, and garnered around 84,000 likes within a week. Taking note of its popularity and with encouragement from her followers, she adapted it into a full song titled "Lost Boy", which she posted on YouTube on January 18, 2015 and was released on iTunes on February 12, 2015. Dozens of Vine and YouTube users posted covers, which helped further its popularity and increased Berhe's following on social media. Record labels took notice and she then signed with Columbia Records in July 2015.

Her debut EP, The Intro, was released on November 27, 2015. It has four songs including "Lost Boy".

Music video
A music video for the song was released on YouTube on May 9, 2016. As of January 2023, the video has garnered over 171 million views.

Critical reception
Mike Wass of Idolator called it a "pretty ballad" and went on to say that "[Lost Boy] is nostalgic, more than a little bittersweet and aptly showcases Ruth's smooth vocals."

Charts

Weekly charts

Year-end charts

Certifications

References

2015 songs
2015 debut singles
2010s ballads
Columbia Records singles
Music videos directed by Mark Pellington
Pop ballads
Songs about fictional male characters
Songs about fictional female characters
Ruth B. songs
Sony Music singles